Tunkhannock Creek may refer to the following streams in the U.S. state of Pennsylvania:

Tunkhannock Creek (Susquehanna River tributary)
Tunkhannock Creek (Tobyhanna Creek)